Bata from Saka is an Egyptian bull-god of the New Kingdom, who represents together with his brother Anubis the 17th Upper Egyptian Nome.

History
Until the middle of the Eighteenth Dynasty Bata was represented as a ram and later as a bull. Bata is probably identical with the death god Bt of the Egyptian Old Kingdom, known from the Saqqara necropolis, for instance from the Mastaba of Ti. Bata is not mentioned in the Pyramid Texts and Coffin Texts.

In literature
Bata is the name of the protagonist in the Tale of Two Brothers, a copy of which survives on the New Kingdom Papyrus D’Orbiney, where he is the brother of Anubis. He is also mentioned in the Ptolemaic Papyrus Jumilhac.

See also
 List of Egyptian deities
 Cattle in religion and mythology
 Tale of Two Brothers

Bibliography
 Susan T. Hollis: On the Nature of Bata, the Hero of the Papyrus d'Orbiney, in: Chronique d'Égypte 59, 1984, 248-257

External links
 Tale of Two Brothers

Death gods
Underworld gods
Egyptian gods
Fertility gods
Animal gods
Cattle deities